The TCR China Touring Car Championship is a touring car racing series based in China. The series was officially launched in December 2016, ahead of a five-round 2017 championship season, with the slight name change from Chinese to China.

Champions

References

External links
 Official website

TCR Series
Auto racing series in China
2017 establishments in China